is a lawyer and former Justice of the Supreme Court of Japan.

She was born on February 7, 1949. In 1973, she earned her law degree from the University of Tokyo. On February 16, 2013, Onimaru was appointed as a Justice of the Supreme Court of Japan. Prior to her judgeship, Onimaru practiced for decades as a family law attorney. She had also served as a member of the National Life Council of the Cabinet Office and the Ministry of Health, Labor and Welfare Labor Insurance Review Board. She retired from the bench on February 6, 2019, and currently serves as a LIXIL Group Board of Director.

See also 

 List of Justices of the Supreme Court of Japan
 Supreme Court of Japan

References 

Japanese women lawyers
Supreme Court of Japan justices
University of Tokyo alumni
1949 births
Living people